Kaghaz-e Akhbar was a monthly newspaper published in Qajar Iran.

Publishing its first issue on 1 May 1837, it was the first newspaper to be published in Iran, then known by the name Persia.

The newspaper's creation was ordered by Mohammad Shah Qajar and was directed by Mirza Saleh Shirazi in Tehran. It did not have a specific name and was a direct translation of the English name "newspaper" into Persian. The first issue included news such as the actions of the Shah, the defeating of the Turkmen Gokalan and Yomut tribes and forceful migration of their women and children into the Iranian capital of Tehran.

Despite the point that the newspaper was published every month without an interruption for at least three years, there are only a few scattered copies remaining, with only two copies held in the British library.

See also 

 Mirat-ul-Akhbar, the first published newspaper in Persian language, published in India.

References 

Newspapers published in Iran